Nervilia uniflora, commonly known as the red shield orchid, is a small terrestrial orchid found in northern Queensland. It has a single short-lived, pink or mauve flower. A dark green, heart-shaped leaf emerges at the base of the flowering stem after flowering.

Description
Nervilia uniflora is a terrestrial, perennial, deciduous, sympodial herb which grows in colonies with only a few individuals producing flowers in any one year. After flowering, a single heart-shaped leaf develops, including on those plants that did not flower. Flowering occurs between November and January.

Taxonomy and naming
The red shield orchid was first formally described in 1866 by Ferdinand von Mueller who gave it the name Pogonia uniflora and published the description in Fragmenta phytographiae Australiae. In 1906 Rudolf Schlechter changed the name to Nervilia uniflora. The specific epithet (uniflora) means "one-flowered".

Distribution and habitat
Nervilia uniflora occurs in north Queensland between Cooktown and Proserpine. It grows in woodland, forest and rainforest.

References 

uniflora
Plants described in 1866
Orchids of Queensland
Taxa named by Ferdinand von Mueller